Porcello is an Italian surname. Notable people with the surname include:

 Massimilian Porcello (born 1980), German-Italian football (soccer) player
 Rick Porcello (born 1988), American baseball player
 Sam Porcello (1935/36–2012), American food scientist

Italian-language surnames